Zeravani is a sports club based in Duhok, Iraqi Kurdistan, Iraq. It was formed in 2011, entering competition in the Kurdish Premier League.

Club history
The predecessor club was known as Peris FC, which competed in the Iraqi Premier League, a FIFA sanctioned league, until the 2009–10 season. The club then ceased operation.

In 2011, Zeravani SC was formed from the remnants of Peris FC, and began competing in the Kurdish Premier League. It used the same stadium and same colours as Peris FC. Zeravani SC were champions of the 2012–13 Kurdish Premier League season and runners-up of the 2015–16 Iraqi Women's Football League season.

Current squad

References

External links
 Official website 

2011 establishments in Iraq
Duhok
Association football clubs established in 2011
Football clubs in Dohuk